At least two ships of the Hellenic Navy have borne the name Vasilissa Olga after Queen Olga of Greece:

 , an armoured corvette launched in 1870 and scrapped in 1925.
 , a destroyer launched in 1938 and sunk in 1943

Hellenic Navy ship names